MXC or mxc may refer to:

 Manyika dialect (ISO 639:mxc)
 Mexico City, the capital of Mexico
 Mexicargo (ICAO: MXC)
 Monticello Airport (Utah) (IATA: MXC)
 Most Extreme Elimination Challenge, an American TV program
 Multimedia extension connector, a video connector
 The year 1090